Hanchett is a surname. Notable people with the surname include:

Lani Hanchett (1919–1975), American Episcopal bishop
Luther Hanchett (1825–1862), American lawyer, politician, and pioneer
Mary Hunt (née Hanchett, 1830–1906), American activist

English-language surnames